Gambhiranata is a rāga in Carnatic music (musical scale of South Indian classical music) and Yakshagana where it is called Naati. It is an audava rāgam (or owdava rāga, meaning pentatonic scale). It is a janya rāga (derived scale), as it does not have all the seven swaras (musical notes). Gambhiranata is also known as Shuddha Nata.

Structure and Lakshana 

Gambhiranata is a symmetric rāga that does not contain rishabham or dhaivatam. It is a pentatonic scale (audava-audava ragam in Carnatic music classification – audava meaning 'of 5'). Its ascending and descending scale structure is as follows:

 : 
 : 

The notes used in this scale are shadjam, antara gandharam, shuddha madhyamam, panchamam and kakali nishadam (see swaras in Carnatic music for details on below notation and terms). Gambhiranata is considered a janya rāgam of Chalanata, the 36th Melakarta rāgam, though it can be derived from 8 other melakarta rāgams, by dropping both rishabham and dhaivatam.

Popular compositions 
Gambhiranata rāgam lends itself for elaboration due to the pentatonic nature and symmetricity of the scale. The mallari tune played in Nadhaswaram at temple processions are set to this musical scale. Here are some compositions set to this scale.

Mudadinda Ninna kondaduvenu: ancient traditional invocation song in Yakshagana.
Sri jalandharam composed by Jayachamaraja Wodeyar
Jayadevaki kishora by Swati Tirunal
Tiru Tiru Javarale By Annamacharya
Sharanambe vani by Purandaradasa
Enu Sadhana Madi By Bannanje Govindacharya
Ini aedu kavalai by Periyasaamy Thooran
 Varnam – Amma Anandadayini by M. Balamuralikrishna
Girijaramana by Mysore Vasudevachar
Kalinga Narthana Thillana  and Sri Vighna rajam bhaje- Othukkadu venkata kavi

Film Songs

Language: Tamil

Related rāgams

Graha bhedam 
Gambhiranata's notes when shifted using Graha bhedam, yields another pentatonic rāgam, Bhupalam. Graha bhedam is the step taken in keeping the relative note frequencies same, while shifting the shadjam to the next note in the rāgam. For more details and illustration of this concept refer Graha bhedam on Gambhiranata.

Amritavarshini is a rāgam which has prati madhyamam in place of the shuddha madhyamam. See below table for more details.
Hamsadhvani is a rāgam which has chathusruthi rishabham in place of the shuddha madhyamam. See below table for more details.

Grahabedam

Scale similarities 
Nata is a rāgam which has scale of Chalanata, the 36th Melakarta rāgam, in the ascending scale, while retaining the descending scale similar to Gambhiranata. Its  structure is S R3 G3 M1 P D3 N3 S : S N3 P M1 G3 S

Notes

References 

Janya ragas